Club de Fútbol Huracán Moncada is a Spanish football team based in Moncada, in the Valencian Community. Founded in 2016, it plays in Regional Preferente – Group 2, holding its home games in ‘’Nou Camp de Morvedre” in Sagunt

History
Huracán Moncada was founded in June 2016, after an agreement from Huracán Valencia CF's board with FBM Moncada CF.

Season to season

References

External links
 

Association football clubs established in 2016
Football clubs in the Valencian Community
Huracán Valencia CF
2016 establishments in the Valencian Community